A debit is one side of an entry in double-entry bookkeeping, reflecting the amount taken out of an account.

Debit may also refer to:

Finance and accounting
Debit card, a type of payment card
Debit MasterCard, a brand of debit card
Visa Debit, a brand of debit card
Bank account debits tax, an Australian tax
Debit commission, a commission in the Holy Roman Empire
Debit spread, a financial trading concept

Grapes
Debit (grape), a Croatian grape variety
Debit, or Bombino bianco, an Italian grape variety

Other uses
Debits and Credits (book)
"Debits Field", a derisive name for Citi Field

See also
Credit (disambiguation)
Debito Arudou
Debt